Mitsuko Ishii (born 25 February 1954 in Tokyo) is a Japanese politician who has served as a member of the House of Councillors of Japan since 2016. She represents the National proportional representation block and is a member of the Japan Innovation Party.

References 

Living people
1954 births
Politicians from Tokyo
21st-century Japanese politicians
21st-century Japanese women politicians
Members of the House of Councillors (Japan)
Japan Innovation Party politicians